Levan Abramishvili (born 27 July 1970) is a Georgian alpine skier. He competed in the 1994 and 1998 Winter Olympics.

References

1970 births
Living people
Alpine skiers at the 1994 Winter Olympics
Alpine skiers at the 1998 Winter Olympics
Male alpine skiers from Georgia (country)
Olympic alpine skiers of Georgia (country)
People from Samtskhe–Javakheti